The International School of the Basel Region AG (ISBR AG) is an English-speaking school for students from ages 3–19 (PYP1-DP2). ISB is an authorised International Baccalaureate (IB) World School, and offers the following programmes:
IB Diploma Programme (DP)
IB Middle Years Programme (MYP)
IB Primary Years Programme (PYP)

Its Headquaters are at Reinach, Basel-Landschaft, in the Reinach Campus. There is also a Fiechten Campus in Reinach, and also the Aesch campus in Aesch.

History of ISB

ISB was founded in 1979 by Janet Galli, an American entrepreneur, as a response to a perceived need among expatriates for English-speaking schooling. The School began life with just 15 students and in a single schoolhouse. Student numbers grew rapidly, and at one point the School rented premises at 13 campuses in the Basel region. By 1995, ISB had become an IB World School, offering the Diploma Programme (DP) of the IB. By 1999, the School became a not-for-profit company, known as the International School of the Basel Region AG. That year it broadened its scope to include the IB Middle Years Programme (MYP). In 2002, Reinach - the first of ISB’s three current campuses – was opened. In the same year, ISB began to offer the IB Primary Years Programme (PYP). In 2007, the purpose-built campus at Aesch opened to accommodate the Junior School. Since 2012, students in the early years of the MYP have attended the campus at Fiechten. In the 35 years since its inception, ISB has grown exponentially and today educates over 1400 students representing approximately 60 nationalities. .

Accreditation and Authorisation

ISB is an International Baccalaureate (IB) World School. The School is accredited by both the Council of International Schools (CIS) and the New England Association of Schools and Colleges (NEASC). ISB is authorised to be a PSAT and SAT testing centre and is also an examination centre for the Associated Board of the Royal School of Music (ABRSM).

Due to longstanding academic commitment and the school's request, ISB was one of 14 international schools that piloted the new Global Politics course for the IB.

ISBR's Kindergarten, primary education, and also lower secondary programs (Primary Years Programme, Secondary Years Programme) are not approved as Volksschule (Kindergarten, Primarstufe, and Sekundarstufe) by the bureau for elementary school (Volksschulen), administration for education (Erziehungsdirektion), canton of Basel-City.

ISBR's upper secondary education programs (Diploma Programme, International Baccalaureate) are neither approved as a Mittelschule by the bureau for gymnasial and vocational education (Mittelschulen und Berufsbildung), administration of education (Erziehungsdirektion), canton of Basel-City, nor by the Swiss Federal State Secretariat for Education, Research and Innovation SERI, neither.

ISB in Basel

The International School of Basel Region AG (known as ISB) is a not-for-profit, self-supporting company, acknowledged as a private school by the local authority Basel-Landschaft, registered under Swiss law and abiding by all local authority requirements. The purpose of the ISBR AG is the operation of an English-speaking private day school for girls and boys. The School is committed to promoting learning, cultural awareness and international understanding and to developing respect and appreciation for people of all nationalities, religions and cultural backgrounds. ISB staff and students comprise upwards of forty different nationalities, including many Swiss nationals. The educational programmes offered by  ISB (see International Baccalaureate, below) are recognised and accepted by Swiss universities, subject to the usual academic requirements.

Campuses

ISB has three campuses, located in the canton of Basel-Landschaft: Aesch for the Junior School (PYP1-8), Fiechten for the Middle School (MYP1-3) and Reinach for the Senior School (MYP4-5; DP1-2).

International Baccalaureate (IB)

The international educational foundation the International Baccalaureate (IB) was founded in 1968. Its headquarters are in Geneva, Switzerland.
From 3 to 19 years, International School Basel students study the International Baccalaureate (IB) curriculum through three programmes (Primary Years, Middle Years and Diploma).
Many ISB students belong to families who anticipate periodic relocation from one city or country to another. Studying the IB curriculum allows students joining an IB school in a new location the flexibility and opportunity to continue their education as seamlessly as possible. As an authorised IB World School, ISB welcomes regular evaluation by the IB and undergoes reaccreditation with the international agencies CIS and NEASC. 
The School’s IB scores are consistently above the world average and many ISB students choose to continue to tertiary education in colleges and universities in Europe and the USA as well as in Switzerland (see ISB in Basel, above). Although the language of instruction is English, students also study German (with French and Spanish options). Typically, more than a quarter of ISB students go on to achieve an  IB Bilingual Diploma at the end of their studies. The enrollment fee is CHF 4,500 for new students and for those returning after an absence of more than 14 months. Annual tuition fees range from CHF 13,410 to CHF 35,420 for the academic year 2022/23.

References

International Baccalaureate schools in Switzerland
American international schools in Switzerland
Buildings and structures in Basel-Landschaft
Secondary schools in Switzerland